The 30th Kisei was held from May 2005 to February 22, 2006. The players to have qualified through preliminary tournaments are Toshiya Imamura, Atsushi Kato, Hideki Komatsu, and Kunihisa Honda. The players to have returned from the previous year are Satoshi Yuki, Norimoto Yoda, Cho U, Tomoyasu Mimura, Keigo Yamashita, O Rissei, O Meien, and Kobayashi Satoru. The two players with the worst records at the end of each league are disqualified from an automatic berth in the following tournament. 

Keigo Yamashita came out victorious with a sweep of 4 games to none. It was the first time since the 5th Kisei in 1981 where there was a sweep. The title was Yamashita's second Kisei in 3 years, the first coming in the 27th Kisei versus O Rissei.

Preliminaries

Group A

Group B

Group C

Group D

Main tournament

Group A

* Norimoto Yoda held the tiebreaker over Cho U.

Group B

** O Rissei held the tiebreaker over O Meien.

Key:
Green - Winner of group; earns a spot in the challenger final.
Blue - Earns a place in the next edition's group stage.
Red - Eliminated from automatic berth; must qualify through preliminary stages.

Challenger finals

Finals

References

External links
The 30th Kisei at GoBase.org
The 30th Kisei at Igo-Kisen

Kisei (Go)
2005 in go
2006 in go